Kamenik refers to the following places:

 Kamenik, Bulgaria
 Kamenik, Slovenia
 Kamenik, Montenegro